Elephant Mountain is an album by the American rock band The Youngbloods, released in 1969. It reached number 118 on the Billboard 200 chart.

History
With the departure of member and co-founder Jerry Corbitt, Jesse Colin Young became the primary songwriter of the band, penning seven of the 13 tracks on the album, and co-writing four more with Lowell "Banana" Levinger and Joe Bauer. The four tracks credited to Young, Banana, and Bauer are all instrumentals.

Levinger's "On Sir Francis Drake" is an instrumental named after Sir Francis Drake Boulevard of Marin County, where the band had recently moved. At 6:44 it is the longest track on the album, consisting of two sections, the first an electric piano-based waltz, the second a blues jam with some bass soloing by Young. The only other song on the album not co-written by Young is "Rain Song (Don't Let the Rain Bring You Down)", which is similar to their earlier "jug band" style songs like "Euphoria" and "The Wine Song"; it was co-written by Jerry Corbitt, Felix Pappalardi and Gail Collins, his wife.

According to the liner notes on the Sundazed reissue, the album was "begun in New York early in 1967, then finished in RCA's Hollywood studios after the band moved to San Francisco, but not released until 1969." Liner notes writer Jud Cost mentions that original member, Jerry Corbitt, though uncredited in the liner notes, performs "on a couple of Elephant Mountain tracks, notably singing the vocal with Young on 'Smug'."

Unlike their previous albums, there are no covers of songs by other artists.

The album was included in the book 1001 Albums You Must Hear Before You Die.

Although not specified on the album cover, the mountain depicted is Black Mountain (locally called Elephant Mountain), located west of the Nicasio Reservoir in Marin County.

Sundazed released a remastered version in 2008 with "Previously Unissued Bonus Tracks," including "Pool Hall Song" and "Beautiful" (alternate version).

In 2014, RCA of Japan released a 19 track version of the album.

Critical reception

Reviewing for The Village Voice in 1969, Robert Christgau wrote, "In the manner of tight groups, the Youngbloods stretch thinner all the time. Not only have they lost Jerry Corbitt, but their own expertise has become somehow attenuated. Banana used to be the most tasteful electric pianist in rock. Now he has become so tasteful he can sounds like Roy Kral on a lazy night." Lester Bangs was more enthusiastic in Rolling Stone, saying "this is one of the most encouraging albums I have heard in months. ... This album exudes that supremely rare commodity in these dark, bored, destructive times – joy."

Years later, Rolling Stone said the album "bridges the gap between the last days of psychedelia and the outbreak of country-rock that had afflicted artists like the Byrds and Neil Young." In a retrospective review for AllMusic, Lindsay Planer praised the album, feeling that it "contains some of the band's strongest material to date". The New York Times described the album as their "1969 folk-rock touchstone".

Track listing

Side one
 "Darkness, Darkness" (Jesse Colin Young) – 3:51
 "Smug" (Young) – 2:13
 "On Sir Francis Drake" (Lowell Levinger) – 6:44
 "Sunlight" (Young) – 3:07
 "Double Sunlight" (Levinger, Young, Joe Bauer) – 0:41
 "Beautiful" (Young) – 3:49
 "Turn It Over" (Levinger, Young, Bauer) – 0:15

Side two
 "Rain Song (Don't Let the Rain Bring You Down)" (Jerry Corbitt, Felix Pappalardi, Gail Collins) – 3:13
 "Trillium" (Levinger, Young, Bauer) – 3:08
 "Quicksand"* (Young) – 2:41
 "Black Mountain Breakdown" (Levinger, Young, Bauer) – 0:40
 "Sham"* (Young) – 2:44
 "Ride the Wind" (Young) – 6:37

Sundazed 2008 Reissue
 "Darkness, Darkness" (Jesse Colin Young) – 3:51
 "Smug" (Young) – 2:13
 "On Sir Francis Drake" (Lowell Levinger) – 6:44
 "Sunlight" (Young) – 3:07
 "Double Sunlight" (Levinger, Young, Joe Bauer) – 0:41
 "Beautiful" (Young) – 3:49
 "Turn It Over" (Levinger, Young, Bauer) – 0:15
 "Rain Song (Don't Let the Rain Bring You Down)" (Corbitt, Pappalardi, Collins) – 3:13
 "Trillium" (Levinger, Young, Bauer) – 3:08
 "Quicksand"* (Young) – 2:41
 "Black Mountain Breakdown" (Levinger, Young, Bauer) – 0:40
 "Sham"* (Young) – 2:44
 "Ride the Wind" (Young) – 6:37
 "Pool Hall Song" (Young) – 3:04
 "Beautiful" (Alternate Version) (Young) – 9:31

RCA Japan 2014 Reissue
 "Darkness, Darkness" (Jesse Colin Young) – 3:51
 "Smug" (Young) – 2:13
 "On Sir Francis Drake" (Lowell Levinger) – 6:44
 "Sunlight" (Young) – 3:07
 "Double Sunlight" (Levinger, Young, Joe Bauer) – 0:41
 "Beautiful" (Young) – 3:49
 "Turn It Over" (Levinger, Young, Bauer) – 0:15
 "Rain Song (Don't Let the Rain Bring You Down)" (Corbitt, Pappalardi, Collins) – 3:13
 "Trillium" (Levinger, Young, Bauer) – 3:08
 "Quicksand"* (Young) – 2:41
 "Black Mountain Breakdown" (Levinger, Young, Bauer) – 0:40
 "Sham"* (Young) – 2:44
 "Ride the Wind" (Young) – 6:37
 "Pool Hall Song" (Young) – 3:04
 "On Sir Francis Drake" (Alternate Mono Version)
 "Beautiful" (Alternate Mono Version) (Young) – 9:31
 "Smug" (Alternate Mono Version)
 "Sham" (Alternate Mono Version)
 "Radio Spot For Elephant Mountain"

Personnel
The Youngbloods
Jesse Colin Young – bass, lead vocals, acoustic guitar on "Sunlight"
Lowell "Banana" Levinger – guitar, backing vocals, electric piano
Joe Bauer – drums
Additional musicians
Jerry Corbitt – guitar and vocals (uncredited in original liner notes)
David Lindley – fiddle
Plas Johnson – tenor saxophone
Joe Clayton – trumpet
Victor Feldman – vibraphone
Technical
Charles E. Daniels (Charlie Daniels) – producer
The Youngbloods and Bob Cullen – producer (Tracks marked *. These two tracks were recorded prior to Jerry Corbitt's departure from the band.)
Richie Schmidt – engineer 
Hank Cicalo – engineer
Mickey Crofford – engineer

Charts
Album

Singles

References

1969 albums
The Youngbloods albums
Albums produced by Charlie Daniels
Albums produced by Jesse Colin Young
RCA Records albums
Folk rock albums by American artists
Country rock albums by American artists